AWY or awy may refer to:

  Edera Awyu language, ISO 639-3 code, awy
 Aluva railway station, Kerala, India, station code